Polyhymno paraintortoides is a moth of the family Gelechiidae. It was described by Oleksiy V. Bidzilya and Wolfram Mey in 2011. It is found in Namibia and South Africa.

References

Moths described in 2011
Polyhymno